Nebraska Highway 99 is a highway in southeastern Nebraska.  It has a southern terminus at the Kansas border south of Burchard and just north of Summerfield, Kansas.  Its northern terminus is north of Burchard at an intersection with Nebraska Highway 4.  It lies entirely in Pawnee County.  It is a part of a three-state "Highway 99" which includes K-99 in Kansas and Oklahoma State Highway 99.

Route description
Nebraska Highway 99 begins just north of Summerfield, Kansas.  The southern terminus of NE 99 is also the northern terminus of K-99.  A couple miles north of the border, it is paired with Nebraska Highway 8 for several miles through farmland.  After the two highways separate, NE 99 continues north through Burchard.  After , NE 99 meets Nebraska Highway 4 and ends.

Major intersections

See also

References

External links

 The Nebraska Highways Page: Highways 61 to 100
 Nebraska Roads: NE 81-100

099
Transportation in Pawnee County, Nebraska